William Hoge may refer to:

 William Hoge (Pennsylvania politician), U.S. Representative from Pennsylvania
 William Hoge (California politician), member of the California State Assembly
 William M. Hoge, United States Army general